St. Paul's Church is an evangelical Anglican church in downtown Halifax, Nova Scotia, within the Diocese of Nova Scotia and Prince Edward Island of the Anglican Church of Canada. It is located at the south end of the Grand Parade, an open square in downtown Halifax with Halifax City Hall at the northern end.

The church is modelled after Marybone Chapel in Westminster, London, which was designed by controversial architect James Gibbs, the architect of St Martin-in-the-Fields at Trafalgar Square.

Built during Father Le Loutre's War, it is the oldest surviving Protestant church in Canada and the oldest building in Halifax. There is also a crypt below the church.  Close to the church is the St. Paul's Church Cemetery. The official chapel of the church was the Little Dutch (Deutsch) Church.

Saint Paul's was designated a National Historic Site of Canada in 1981. In 1981, it was designated a Municipal Registered Heritage Property by the former City of Halifax, and in 1983 it was designated a Provincially Registered Heritage Property both under the provincial Heritage Property Act.

History 

St. Paul's Church was founded in 1749 (the same year as the Halifax colony). The construction was begun in 1750 and is based on the ground plan of Gibbs' Marybone Chapel (later St. Peter's, Vere Street) in London, with later additions such as a larger tower. The Reverend William Tutty (1715–1754) opened the church on 2 September 1750. Rev. William Tutty was the first minister (1750–54); followed by Rev. John Breynton (1754–91) and Rev. Thomas Wood (1752–64), who served at the same time. The church also served as the site for the initial congregation of St. Matthew's United Church (Halifax) until this church was built.

During the French and Indian War (the North American theatre of the Seven Years' War), the church was the site of the burials of two prominent Nova Scotians:  Governor Charles Lawrence (d.1760) and Catholic Priest Pierre Maillard (d.1762), the latter ceremony was attended by a large number of Mi'kmaq people.  (Also during the war, the church was where Horatio Gates married Elizabeth Phillips in 1754.) Soon after the war, Vice-Admiral Philip Durell (d. 1766) was buried after having participated in the Siege of Louisbourg (1758) and the Siege of Quebec (1759).

During the American Revolution the church held funerals for Francis McLean (d. 1781) who defended New Ireland (Maine) during the war; Capt Henry Francis Evans (d.1781) who died in the Naval Battle off Cape Breton (1781); Baron Oberst Franz Carl Erdmann von Seitz Hatchment (d.1782) who was the commander of the Hessian soldiers that defended Lunenburg in the Raid on Lunenburg (1782); and Governor Michael Francklin (d. 1782), whose funeral was also attended by a large number of Mi'kmaq people.

After the American Revolution, with the creation of the Diocese of Nova Scotia in 1787, St. Paul's was given the Bishop's seat, making it the first Anglican cathedral outside of Great Britain. It served as the cathedral from 1787 to 1864. The diocese included Nova Scotia, New Brunswick, Newfoundland, St. Johns (now Prince Edward Island), and across Quebec and Ontario to Windsor, and Bermuda. For many decades it was one of the few places of worship in Halifax, and other denominations would thus hold services in the building.

During the Halifax Explosion of 1917, a piece of wooden window frame from another building was lodged into the wall of St. Paul's Church, where it remains today.

Prominent monuments

Men

Women

Silver communion service 

The service originally consisted of five pieces: four pieces have the mark of King George I (2 flagons, a Chalice and an alms receiver). Two of these pieces also have the mark of Queen Anne (a flagon and the alms receiver), which are dated 1713. The fifth piece – the paten – was damaged and melted down around 1819. All the pieces are made from Britannia silver.  In 1783, Governor Parr had the service given to St. Paul's.

The silversmith Francis Garthorne (1641–1729) marked all of the pieces with a "G" encircling a small Roman capital A. Garthorne's work is in the collections of Metropolitan Museum of Art, New York City, the Museum of Fine Arts, Boston, and the Royal Collection Trust. He created five of the ten Ceremonial maces now on display in the Jewel House at the Tower of London.

Sculptures 
Some of the monuments in the church showcase sculptures by England's leading sculptors during the nineteenth century. All of whom exhibited their work at the Royal Academy of Arts and have their work in the National Portrait Gallery (London), the Tate, Museum of Fine Arts, Boston, Massachusetts State House, Trafalgar Square, St Paul's Cathedral, Buckingham Palace and Westminster Abbey.

There are two stone carvings by Samuel Nixon, one of a shipwreck and the other of the Parable of the Good Samaritan. Nixon was commissioned by the City of London to create a statue of King William IV (1844), which Gentleman's Magazine called "a masterpiece" and an example of "artistic genius."

Another sculpture was created by Sir Francis Leggatt Chantrey (for Amelia Ann Smyth). Chantrey's most notable works include the statues of King George IV (Trafalgar Square); King George III (Guildhall), and George Washington (Massachusetts State House). He also executed four monuments to military heroes for St Paul's Cathedral. (Chantrey's sculpture of Sir Walter Scott was commissioned for Victoria Park, Halifax, Nova Scotia.)

There is also a sculpture by Richard Westmacott III (for Sampson Salter Blowers). Westmacoott was the son of Sir Richard Westmacott. Among Westmacott III's most notable works is the pediment of the Royal Exchange (London); the monument commemorating Sir John Franklin (Greenwich Hospital). (Westmacott's uncle architect John Westmacott (d. 1816) is buried in the Old Burying Ground in Halifax, Nova Scotia.)

There is a sculpture in St. Paul's Church by John Gibson (for Richard John Uniacke, Jr.) and a monument by William F. Woodington (Henry Hezekiah Cogswell's monument to his children). Woodington's work includes statues on Westminster Bridge, Nelson's Column (Trafalgar Square), St. Paul's Cathedral, and the House of Lords.

Ministers (1749–1824) 
 Rev. William Tutty (1749–1752) and his assistant, Rev. William Anwyl (1749–1750),
 Rev. Jean-Baptiste Moreau (clergyman) (1750–1753) took on the role of Tutty's assistant; later became the 1st minister of St. John's Anglican Church (Lunenburg)
 Rev. Thomas Wood (1752–1764) (assistant); 1st minister at Annapolis; buried at Garrison Cemetery (Annapolis Royal, Nova Scotia)
Rev. John Breynton (1753–1791), first Rector
 Charles Inglis, 1st Bishop of Nova Scotia, (1781), only minister buried in crypt
 Rev. Joshua Wingate Weeks (1785–1791), brother-in-law of Rev. Jacob Bailey
Rev. Robert Stanser (1791–1816), 2nd Bishop  – his wife Mary Stanser, died 1815, is buried in the crypt
Rev. John Inglis (1816–1824), 3rd Bishop (appointed 1825, father of John Eardley Inglis).
 Rev. John Thomas Twining (curate) (1817)
 Rev. William Cogswell (minister) (Henry Hezekiah Cogswell's son) (curate), (1833–1847)
 Rev. Robert Willis (minister) (1824–1865)

The crypt and commemorations 
The crypt contains the remains of 20 congregants which are listed below. Also indicated below are those that have been commemorated in the church through a plaque, a hatchment or a window.

Founders of Halifax

American Revolution 

 Lieutenant General William Neville Gardiner, died 1806, (crypt, no plaque) fought alongside Sir William Howe in the Philadelphia campaign (1777) and was wounded in the Battle of Monmouth.

French Revolutionary Wars (1792–1802) 

 Lieutenant Colonel David Meredith, died 1809

Napoleonic Wars (1803–1815) 

 Lt. Col. Peter Waterhouse (military officer), c. 1823 81st Regiment of Foot (plaque; tomb in Old Burying Ground)
 Lieutenant-Colonel John James Snodgrass (1796–1841), a British military officer, fought in the Battle of Waterloo (1815) and was an aide-de-camp to Sir Archibald Campbell, 1st Baronet and author. (plaque; tomb in Old Burying Ground)
John George Deware (Dewar), HMS Rose, died 1830 (plaque; also gravestone in St. Paul's cemetery, and commemorative headstone in Borthwick Churchyard, Borthwick, Midlothian.)

Second Boer War 

 Stanley Banfield, d. , 2nd Canadian Mounted Rifles (plaque)
 Capt. John Halliburton Laurie, died 1901, son of John Wimburn Laurie (plaque)

WW1

Other 

 Lt. Gov. of Nova Scotia Peregrine Maitland's infant son George Bertie Maitland, (crypt) died 1831
Rear admiral Leonard W. Murray, died 1971 – ashes in the Naval Columbarium (Naval Vault)
Alfred Gilpin Jones
 Charles Francis Norton, died 1835, 52nd Light Infantry (monument)
 Capt. Douglas, HMS Sylph, died 1813 
Sarah Mudge, died 1818 (crypt) 
 Joseph Frederick Wallet DesBarres – Governor of Prince Edward Island and Cape Breton is buried at St. George's Church
 Window for Jane Tremaine, Sunday school Teacher for 65 years; only memorial Window destroyed in the explosion

Prominent families

Uniacke Family 

The family of Richard John Uniacke dominates the plaques and monuments in St. Paul's Church. On separate occasions, two Uniacke family members stood trial for murder.

Almon Family 
The memorials to the family of Dr. William James Almon also dominant the church.  There were four generations of doctors in the family that had a significant impact on the field of medicine in the province. 

 Amelia Rebecca (Almon) Ritchie – daughter of William Bruce Almon – memorial plaque
 John Egan Almon, died 1917 (plaque)
 William Bruce Almon (1875–1940) (plaque)

Cogswell Family 
The memorials to the family of Henry Hezekiah Cogswell also dominate the church.  There are monuments placed to four of his children, three of which died while Henry was alive. His son Rev. William became a celebrated orator and author.

Ritchie Family 
The memorials to the family of Hon. John William Ritchie also dominant the church.  There are memorial windows placed for a son and five of his daughters.  His twelve children donated money for the memorial window on the south side of the church.

Notable events

Marriages

Funerals

Royal visits 
 Saint Paul's has a royal pew, and many royal guests have visited, including the father of Queen Victoria, Prince Edward, and Princesses Michael (1984), Margaret, Alexandra, and Elizabeth (Queen Elizabeth II), and Prince Edward in 1987.

Halifax Explosion 

St. Paul's Church played a significant role in the Halifax Explosion. Doctors used the church as an emergency hospital, using the two vestries to tend to the wounded, while the bodies of the dead were stacked on top of each other around the walls of the nave. Only one stained glass window was broken in the church; however, most of the other windows were smashed, and there were wide cracks in the roof. It was the only church in the city considered safe enough to conduct a service the following day. All the congregations used the church to conduct funerals.

There remains two artifacts in the church from this disaster: the "Explosion Window", which shattered to form a silhouette of a man's head and shoulders. The congregation concluded that the silhouette is the likeness of Abbe Moreau, who arrived with Cornwallis. There is also a piece of a steel window frame that remains embedded in the wall of the vestibule above the inside doors to the church.

See also 

 Little Dutch (Deutsch) Church
St. Matthew's United Church (Halifax)
St. John's Anglican Church (Lunenburg)
 List of oldest buildings and structures in Halifax, Nova Scotia
 History of the Halifax Regional Municipality
History of Nova Scotia
Military history of Nova Scotia
 List of oldest buildings in Canada

References
Texts
 J. Philip McAleer. A pictorial history of St. Paul's Anglican Church, Halifax, Nova Scotia 1 edition Appendix 2, 1993
 
Memorials at St. Paul's Church, Acadiensis, p. 58
 History of St. Paul's Church. PART 1. Collections of the Nova Scotia Historical Society
History of St. Paul's Church. PART 2. Collections of the Nova Scotia Historical Society
C.E. Thomas. St. Paul's Church, Halifax, Revisited. Collections of the Nova Scotia Historical Society. 1961. Vol. 33, pp. 26–27. 
 Harris, V, The Church of St Paul, Halifax, Nova Scotia 1749–1949 (Toronto: 1949)
 The Chancel of St. Paul's Anglican Church, Halifax, Nova Scotia: Form Follows Convenience by J. PHILIP McALEER RACAR: revue d'art canadienne / Canadian Art Review, Vol. 17, No. 1 (1990), pp. 46–53, 99–101

Endnotes

External links

Anglican church buildings in Nova Scotia
Heritage sites in Nova Scotia
Religious organizations established in 1749
18th-century Anglican church buildings in Canada
Churches in Halifax, Nova Scotia
Churches completed in 1750
National Historic Sites in Nova Scotia
Churches on the National Historic Sites of Canada register
Culture of Nova Scotia